Hợp ca tranh tài was a Vietnamese reality talent contest that made its debut on VTV3 in Vietnam on February 24, 2012. There were about twelve episodes scheduled to air.

The format was developed from an idea from the Swedish singer and choir leader Caroline af Ugglas and based upon the US format .

The format was a multi-province "bragging rights" competition between about 15-person choirs assembled in the hometowns of the recording artists that support them. The choirs compete for a cash prize of 500 million VND. The prize is in the form of a contribution to a charity active in the artist's hometown.

The choir led by Siu Black, Mỹ Lệ, Đức Tuấn, Khánh Linh, Nguyễn Ngọc Anh, Phương Thanh and Phan Đinh Tùng.

Teams and results

Song list 
Each choir performed as part of a multi-choir medley format as well as songs for the finale night of the show. The choirs will be eliminated one by one until the final two choirs move to the finale.

Episode 1
7 teams and their coaches - Tôi là người Việt Nam (Nguyễn Hải Phong)
Team Mỹ Lệ - Chuông gió (Võ Thiện Thanh)
Team Khánh Linh - Phố khuya (Giáng Son)
Team Siu Black - Ngẫu hứng sông Hồng (Trần Tiến)
Team Ngọc Anh - Bài hát cho anh (Đỗ Bảo)
Team Phan Đinh Tùng - You Raise Me Up by Secret Garden
Team Phương Thanh - Tôi đọc báo công cộng (Nguyễn Duy Hùng)
Team Đức Tuấn - Tiếng sông Cửu Long (Phạm Đình Chương)

Episode 2
Team Siu Black - Tìm lại (Microwave)
Team Mỹ Lệ - Taxi (Nguyễn Hải Phong)
Team Ngọc Anh - Tát nước đầu đình (Folksong)
Team Khánh Linh - Giận anh (Đức Trí)
Team Đức Tuấn - Bay (Nguyễn Hải Phong)
Team Phan Đinh Tùng - Lời yêu thương (Đức Huy)
Team Phương Thanh - Ngẫu hứng ngựa ô (Trần Tiến)

Episode 3
Eliminated: Team Phương Thanh

Episode 4
Team Khánh Linh - Chiếc Khăn Rơi (Doãn Nho)
Team Đức Tuấn - Tình Ca Phố-Phố Xa-Umbrella (Quốc Bảo-Lê Quốc Thắng-Rihanna)
Team Mỹ Lệ - Hò Giã Gạo (Folksong)
Team Phan Đinh Tùng - Vũ Điệu Hoang Giả (Ukrainian song)
Team Ngọc Anh - Stronger (What doesn't kill you) by Kelly Clarkson
Team Siu Black - Ngọn Lửa Cao Nguyên (Trần Tiến)

Episode 5
Eliminated: Team Siu Black

Episode 6
Team Đức Tuấn - The Phantom of The Opera (Andrew Lloyd Webber)
Team Ngọc Anh - Xuân Chiến Khu (Xuân Hồng)
Team Phan Đinh Tùng - Đường Cong (Nguyễn Hải Phong)
Team Khánh Linh - Quạt Giấy-Guốc Mộc (Lưu Thiên Hương)
Team Mỹ Lệ - Wavin' Flag by K'naan

Episode 7
Eliminated: Team Khánh Linh

Episode 8
Team Phan Đinh Tùng - Bang Bang (Phạm Duy)
Team Mỹ Lệ - Con cò (Lưu Hà Anh)
Team Ngọc Anh - Em yêu anh (Ngọc Bích)
Team Đức Tuấn - Đoàn Lữ Nhạc (Đỗ Nhuận)

Episode 9
Eliminated: Team Ngọc Anh

Elimination order

References 

List of television programmes broadcast by Vietnam Television (VTV)

Vietnamese television series
Vietnam Television original programming
2010s Vietnamese television series
2012 Vietnamese television series debuts
2012 Vietnamese television series endings